Joost Boks (17 April 1942 – 12 June 2020) was a field hockey goalkeeper from the Netherlands. He competed  at 1964 and 1968 Summer Olympics, where his team finished in seventh and fifth place, respectively.

After his career he lived in Georgetown, Ontario, Canada, where he died in 2020.

References

External links
 

1942 births
2020 deaths
Dutch male field hockey players
Field hockey players at the 1964 Summer Olympics
Field hockey players at the 1968 Summer Olympics
Olympic field hockey players of the Netherlands
Field hockey players from Amsterdam
20th-century Dutch people